Bruno Bitencourt Paes (born 24 June 1993) is a Brazilian field hockey player.

Paes competed in the men's field hockey tournament at the 2016 Summer Olympics.

References

External links

1993 births
Living people
Brazilian male field hockey players
Place of birth missing (living people)
Olympic field hockey players of Brazil
Field hockey players at the 2016 Summer Olympics
Field hockey players at the 2015 Pan American Games
South American Games medalists in field hockey
South American Games bronze medalists for Brazil
Pan American Games competitors for Brazil
21st-century Brazilian people